The wide-gamut RGB color space (or Adobe Wide Gamut RGB) is an RGB color space developed by Adobe Systems, that offers a large gamut by using pure spectral primary colors.
It is able to store a wider range of color values than sRGB or Adobe RGB color spaces. As a comparison, the wide-gamut RGB color space encompasses 77.6% of the visible colors specified by the CIELAB color space, while the standard Adobe RGB color space covers just 52.1% and sRGB covers only 35.9%.

When working in color spaces with such a large gamut, it is recommended to work in 16-bit per channel color depth to avoid posterization effects. This will occur more frequently in 8-bit per channel modes as the gradient steps are much larger.

As with sRGB, the color component values in wide-gamut RGB are not proportional to the luminances. Similar to Adobe RGB, a gamma of 2.2 is assumed, without the linear segment near zero that is present in sRGB. The precise gamma value is 563/256, or 2.19921875.

The white point corresponds to D50.
The chromaticities of the primary colors and the white point are as follows:

References

Color space